Bandeirante Futebol Clube was a Brazilian football club based in Maceió, Alagoas. The team last participated in the Campeonato Alagoano Segunda Divisão in the 2005 season.

History
The club was founded on 10 August 1983.

Stadium
Bandeirante Futebol Clube play their home games at Estádio Nélson Peixoto Feijó, nicknamed Feijozão. The stadium has a maximum capacity of 4,800 people.

References

Association football clubs established in 1983
Defunct football clubs in Alagoas
1983 establishments in Brazil